Emirgan Pier is a historic passenger ferryboat pier located in Emirgan neighborhood of Sarıyer district in Istanbul Province, Turkey. It serves ferries in Istanbul running between Çengelköy and İstinye on Bosphorus.

The pier went into service in 1851 as the most of the piers on Bosphorus. The pier, which as situated at that times in front of the Emirgan Mosque, underwent an essential reparation in 1897. In 1900, a new pier was built a little bit south of it by the new owner of the ferryboat line, the Ottoman company "Şirket-i Hayriye", and the original pier was removed. Even though the pier was called sometimes "Mirgün Pier" and then "Uluköy Pier", it held its current name.

The pier was closed down in March 1989, and demolished remaining inaccessible 12 years long during the widening works of the Bosphorus coastal street. After construction of a new pier building again in wood on piles that began in June 2001, it was reopened on November 24, 2001.

References

Ferry piers in Istanbul
1851 establishments in the Ottoman Empire
Transport infrastructure completed in 1851
Sarıyer
Bosphorus
Transport in Istanbul